Anna Magyar is a Hungarian politician, member of the National Assembly (MP) from Fidesz Csongrád County Regional List from 2010 to 2014. She was a member of the Committee on Audit Office and Budget from 14 May 2010 to 5 May 2014.

She was president of the General Assembly of Csongrád County between 2006 and 2014, the first woman to hold that office.

Personal life
She is married to Dr Tibor Asztalos. They have two children.

References

Living people
Fidesz politicians
Members of the National Assembly of Hungary (2010–2014)
Women members of the National Assembly of Hungary
People from Szolnok
21st-century Hungarian women politicians
Year of birth missing (living people)